Estádio João Hora de Oliveira  is a multi-use stadium located in Aracaju, Brazil. It is used mostly for football matches and hosts the home matches of Club Sportivo Sergipe. The stadium has a maximum capacity of 10,000 people.

External links
 Templos do Futebol

Joao Hora de Oliveira
Sports venues in Sergipe